Laurence Temple Bond (31 December 1905 – 1 December 1943) was a British athlete. He competed in the men's pole vault at the 1928 Summer Olympics. He also competed in the pole vault at the 1930 British Empire Games for England.

He was also a medical student at the time of the 1930 Games.

References

External links
 

1905 births
1943 deaths
Athletes (track and field) at the 1928 Summer Olympics
British male pole vaulters
Olympic athletes of Great Britain
Place of birth missing
Athletes (track and field) at the 1930 British Empire Games
Commonwealth Games competitors for England